Mar Montoro is a Spanish presenter.

Personal life 
Mar Montoro was born on 10 August 1977 in Madrid, Spain. 

On 1 August 2013 she married her boyfriend Javi Castano.

Career 

In 1992, she recorded a children's programme about Seville Expo for a French television channel. She then began working at 40 Principales Seville radio station.

From 1998, she signed with 40 Principales Madrid. She worked as a television presenter as host of 40 TV and Canal Plus and on radio, where she hosted in La Mar de Noches and Fan Club Madrid.

In 2001, she began to work in Cadena Dial as presenter of Dial Tal Cual and produced an evening programme, El sitio de mi recreo for the same station. She collaborated on the TV channel Localia TV.

In 2003, she joined COPE radio station news bulletin.

Between 2007 and 2010, she worked in the radio program more listened in the mornings (2 million listeners): Anda Ya! another time on Los 40 Principales. She carried out one of the most important sections in the program: La prueba de novios.

From September 2010 to July 2013, Montoro hosted her own programme, La Mar de Noches on Los 40 Principales.

In 2010, she won the La Academia De La Radio prize for collaboration in the special program from Rock in Rio Madrid.

In March 2011, she appeared on the cover of Interviu magazine. In 2012, she published a book named for her radio show, La Mar de Noches.

In March 2013, she worked as a counselor in the Telecinco program, Mujeres y Hombres y Viceversa.

On 26 August, she presented the program Atrévete with Jaime Cantizano on the radio station Cadena Dial.

On 9 July 2014 Mar left PRISA Radio after 22 years.

References

External links 
	
 

Spanish radio personalities
1977 births
Living people